"Rescue" is a song by American contemporary Christian music singer and songwriter Lauren Daigle. It is the third single from her third studio album, Look Up Child.

Background
"Rescue is probably one of the most personal songs on the record. It was written for someone close to me who was going through a difficult time. I want people to listen to this song and leave feeling that while they may be struggling, there are better times ahead. I've had some time to sing this song around the world and the way that it is connected with people is something that is so surreal. Still to this day, when I listen to this song, I will cry. That's the beauty of this song, that's why it's so personal, that's why it means so much."  Daigle

A Spanish version of the song titled "Rescuta" was released on May 15, 2020, alongside You Say, titled "Tú Dices". As part of a two sided digital single.

Composition
"Rescue" is originally in the key of G♭ major, with a tempo of 50 beats per minute. Written in 6/8 time, Daigle's vocal range spans from E♭3 to D♭5 during the song.

Commercial performance
The song reached No. 2 on the Christian Songs chart and No. 12 on the Bubbling Under Hot 100, spending a total of 13 weeks on the latter chart. It also peaked at No. 1 on UK Cross Rhythms on June 9, 2019. That same year it also peaked at No. 23 on the US Christian Hot AC/CHR year-end chart.

The song was certified Gold by the RIAA on December 12, 2019, and achieved Platinum certification on July 10, 2020.

Track listings 

CD single
"Rescue" — 3:35

Digital download
"Rescue" (Chill Mix) — 3:45

Digital download (Spanglish version)
"Tú Dices"  — 4:33
"Rescata"  — 3:35

Usage in media
The song was featured on November 8, 2018 in Grey's Anatomy seventh episode of the show's 15th season.
It featured in the Britain’s Got Talent Semi Final on 12 September 2020.
The song was also featured in the movie Redeeming Love, when the lead actress is rescued from a brothel

Live performances
Daigle performed the song at SiriusXM Studios on May 17, 2019. She also performed the track on The Today Show on October 8, 2019. As well as on The Kelly Clarkson Show in July 2020.

Music video
A music video for the song was released July 20, 2019. It was filmed by John Gray over two days on the Knik Glacier in Alaska, it opens with Daigle walking along a blue stream cutting through a lunar-like, rocky landscape as she sings, "I hear you whisper underneath your breath/ I hear your S.O.S., your S.O.S." The scene then switches to a verdant green mountainside surrounded by snow-capped mountains as Daigle sheds her black robes in favor of an all-white outfit.

A lyric video for the Spanish version of the song was released on May 15, 2020, coinciding with the release of the song. It includes cuts and unused footage from the official music video.

Credits and personnel
Credits adapted from Tidal.
Lauren Daigle – vocals, songwriter
Jason Ingram – songwriter
Paul Mabury – songwriter
Joe La Porta – mastering engineer

Accolades

Charts

Weekly charts

Year-end charts

Certifications

Release history

References

2018 songs
2019 singles
Lauren Daigle songs
Songs written by Jason Ingram
Pop ballads
Gospel songs
American pop songs
Contemporary Christian songs